Jeannette H. Walworth (Hadermann; pen names, Mother Goose and Ann Atom; February 22, 1835 – February 4, 1918) was an American novelist and journalist. Born in Philadelphia, in 1837, she removed to Natchez, Mississippi, while a child, with her father, Charles Julius Hadermann, a German baron, who became the president of Jefferson College. On his death, the family removed to Louisiana. When she was sixteen years old, Walworth became a governess. In 1873, having married Maj. Douglas Walworth, of Natchez, she accompanied him to his plantation in southern Arkansas, and then to Memphis, Tennessee, before finally removing to New York City. In addition to contributions to the periodical press, the Continent, The Commercial Appeal, and other magazines, she published several novels. Walworth died in 1918.

Early years and education
Jeannette Ritchie Hadermann was born in Philadelphia, Pennsylvania, February 22, 1835. Her father was Charles Julius Hadermann von Winsingen, a German baron and political exile, of Bonn, Prussia. The Baron was a nephew of Count Jean Rapp, created a peer of France by Napoleon for gallantry in battle. He was educated at Heidelberg and at the École Polytechnique in Paris. Political troubles of some nature drove him to the United States. He married, Miss Matilda Norman, of Baltimore by whom he had Jeannette and six other children. By training and inclination he was a military man, and fought with distinction in the Mexican–American War. Circumstances, however, and an excellent education engaged him in teaching. He was at different times professor of languages and mathematics in the University of Virginia, and at Princeton University, Oxford University, and elsewhere. He became president of Jefferson College. The father removed his family to Natchez, Mississippi, where he died, after which, the family moved to Louisiana.

She received a good education and showed great literary talent.

Career
Walworth became a governess at the age of sixteen.

On December 9, 1873, she married the widower, Major Douglas Walworth, a prominent Southern editor, of Natchez. The Major had five children by his first marriage, and none with his second wife. They lived for a time on his plantation in southern Mississippi, and then moved to Memphis, Tennessee, and finally to New York City.

Walworth contributed many stories to newspapers and periodicals. While writing for the Commercial Appeal, she used the pen name, "Mother Goose", and she also was known by the pen name of "Ann Atom". Before marriage, she published: Forgiven at Last (Philadelphia, 1870); The Silent Witness (1871); Dead Men's Shoes (1872). After marriage, her works included: Heavy Yokes (Boston, 1874); Nobody's Business (New York, 1878); The Bar Sinister (1885); Without Blemish (1885); Alice and Scruples (1886); At Bay (New York, 1887); The New Man at Rossmere (1887); Southern Silhouettes (New York, 1887); True to Herself (New York, 1888); That Girl from Texas (New York, 1888); Splendid Egotist (1889); and The Little Radical (1890).

Personal life
Becoming widowed in 1915, she removed from New York City, where she had lived for sixteen years, to New Orleans, Louisiana to live with relatives. Walworth died February 4, 1918, in New Orleans.

Selected works
 Forgiven at Last (1870)
 The Silent Witness (1871)
 Dead Men's Shoes (1872)
 Heavy Yokes (1874)
 Nobody's Business (1878)
 The Bar Sinister (1885)
 Without Blemish (1885)
 Alice and Scruples (1886)
 At Bay (New York, 1887)
 The New Man at Rossmere (1887)
 Southern Silhouettes (1887)
 True to Herself (1888)
 That Girl from Texas (1888)
 Splendid Egotist (1889)
 The Little Radical (1890)

References

Attribution

Bibliography

External links
 
 

1835 births
1918 deaths
19th-century American novelists
19th-century American women writers
19th-century pseudonymous writers
Pseudonymous women writers
American women novelists
American people of German descent
American governesses
Wikipedia articles incorporating text from A Woman of the Century